Ellipanthus tomentosus is a plant in the family Connaraceae. The specific epithet  is from the Latin meaning "thickly covered with hairs", referring to the leaves.

Description
The smooth bark is greyish brown. The flowers are white.

Distribution and habitat
Ellipanthus tomentosus grows naturally in Borneo, the Philippines and Sulawesi. Its habitat is mixed dipterocarp and peat swamp forests.

References

Connaraceae
Flora of Borneo
Flora of the Philippines
Flora of Sulawesi
Plants described in 1872